Elephant Rocks is a sheltered beach in Western Australia, a few hundred metres east of Greens Pool. It is located about 15 km west from Denmark, in William Bay National Park. Its name is derived from a series of exposed rocks, which from several angles resembles a herd of elephants.

Fact sheet
 Location: William Bay National Park
 Directions: 15 km west of Denmark on South Coast Highway, heading towards Walpole
Coordinates:

References 

s

External links 
 Denmark Tourist Bureau
 

Rock formations of Western Australia
Beaches of Western Australia
South coast of Western Australia